Stelios (Greek: Στέλιος) or formally Stylianos (Greek: Στυλιανός) is a Greek first name. This name is given to honor St. Stylianos, a Greek Orthodox saint, the protector of children. The name is derived from the Greek word στυλος (stylos) that means "pillar".

Notable people and characters with the name include:
Stelios Giannakopoulos, association football player
Sir Stelios Haji-Ioannou, owner of easyGroup
Stelios Kazantzidis, singer and novelist
Stelios Constantas, singer
Stelios Arcadiou (better known as Stelarc), performance artist
Stelios Phili, Cypriot-American songwriter and record producer
Stelios, character in the film 300, played by Michael Fassbender

See also 
 Stylianos (disambiguation)

Greek masculine given names